The 1989 Munster Senior Hurling Championship Final was a hurling match that was played on 2 July 1989 at the Páirc Uí Chaoimh, Cork. The winners would advance to the semi-finals of the All-Ireland Senior Hurling Championship.

Tipperary and Waterford contested the final, with Tipperary captained by Bobby Ryan retaining the title, winning 0-26 to 2-8. Tipperary had a 0-12 to 1-5 lead at half-time.

Previous Munster Final encounters

Details

References

External links
Match Highlights
Match Programme Cover

Munster
Munster Senior Hurling Championship Finals
Tipperary GAA matches
Waterford GAA matches